The spotted thick-knee (Burhinus capensis), also known as the spotted dikkop or Cape thick-knee, is a wader in the family Burhinidae. It is native to tropical regions of central and southern Africa.

Description
Its head is large and round with a prominent yellow eye and a short, stout beak. When in flight or standing in a characteristic position with its wings raised, it shows a striking contrasting pattern. Its legs are long and yellow and the tibiotarsal joint is expanded, giving it the name "thick-knee".

Behaviour

The spotted thick-knee is nocturnal and squats on the ground during the daytime, making it difficult to spot. It hunts exclusively on the ground, feeding on insects, small mammals and lizards.

Breeding

It nests on the ground, lining a scrape with grasses, feathers, pebbles and twigs. The female typically lays two eggs, and males and females rear the offspring together, with both bringing food back to the nest. The birds will defend the nest and adopt a defensive pose with wings spread and tail cocked and will even peck an intruder. Sometimes they will fake injuries to lead predators away from the nest.

Distribution
The spotted thick-knee is native to the grasslands and savannas of sub-Saharan Africa. Its range extends from Senegal, Mali and Mauritania in the west to Ethiopia, Kenya, Tanzania and South Africa in the east and south.

Status
The spotted thick-knee has a very extensive range, and its population is believed to be stable. For these reasons, the IUCN has rated it as being of "Least Concern".

Gallery

References

External links

 
 
 
 
 
 
 Spotted thick-knee Species text in The Atlas of Southern African Birds

spotted thick-knee
Birds of Sub-Saharan Africa
spotted thick-knee
Taxa named by Hinrich Lichtenstein